Shurab-e Olya or Shurab-e Bala (Persian: شوراب بالا) or Shur Ab-e Olya, all meaning "Upper Shurab", may refer to:
 Shurab-e Bala, Fars
 Shurab-e Olya, Lorestan
 Shurab-e Olya, Fariman, Razavi Khorasan Province
 Shur Ab-e Olya, Sarakhs, Razavi Khorasan Province
 Shurab-e Olya, Torbat-e Jam, Razavi Khorasan Province